Aamer Majeed (born 12 December 1969 in Lahore) is a Pakistani former first-class cricketer active 1986–1992 who played for Lahore City. Aamer Majeed was a right-handed batsman and a right-arm off break bowler.

References

1969 births
Pakistani cricketers
Lahore City cricketers
Living people